R. Banumathi (born 20 July 1955) is a former Judge of the Supreme Court of India. She is from Tamil Nadu and the sixth woman to be a Judge of the Indian Supreme Court. Earlier, she served as the Chief Justice of Jharkhand High Court and Judge at Madras High Court. She had also served as the Chancellor of Maharashtra National Law University, Aurangabad.

Career
Banumathi joined Tamil Nadu Higher Judicial Service in 1988 as a direct recruit district judge. As a sessions judge, she headed one-person commission on police excess by Special Task Force in Chinnampathy, Coimbatore district in 1995–96.

In April 2003, she was then elevated as judge of the Madras High Court. She dealt with the case on banning Jallikattu or bull hugging sport. In November 2013, she was transferred to the Jharkhand High Court and was appointed Chief Justice of that court at the same time. In August 2014, she was elevated to the Supreme Court of India after her name had been recommended for the post by the collegium headed by then Chief Justice of India, R M Lodha. She is only the second woman sessions judge to rise to the country's highest court.

References

Living people
Justices of the Supreme Court of India
1955 births
Chief Justices of the Jharkhand High Court
Judges of the Madras High Court
Women educators from Tamil Nadu
Educators from Tamil Nadu
20th-century Indian judges
20th-century Indian women judges
21st-century Indian judges
21st-century Indian women judges